Brownwood is an unincorporated community in Morgan County, in the U.S. state of Georgia.

History
The community was named after James Neville Brown, a local landholder.

References

Unincorporated communities in Morgan County, Georgia
Unincorporated communities in Georgia (U.S. state)